Antonio Cabello Baena (born 5 January 1990 in Córdoba) is a Spanish former professional cyclist. He rode in the 2011 Vuelta a España.

References

External links

1990 births
Living people
Spanish male cyclists
Sportspeople from Córdoba, Spain
Cyclists from Andalusia